"Whispers of the Mist Children" is a 1999 fantasy short story by Australian writer Trudi Canavan.

"Whispers of the Mist Children" was first published in Australia, in April 1999, in the twenty-third edition of the Aurealis magazine by Chimaera Publications. It was published alongside six other stories by the authors Robert Hood, Cameron Fade Gurr, Rjurik Davidson, Alistair Ong, Anthony Fordham, and Helen Sargeant. "Whispers of the Mist Children" won the 1999 Aurealis Award for best fantasy short story.

References

External links
Aurealis #23 at Aurealis.com.au

1999 short stories
Australian short stories
Fantasy short stories
Works originally published in Aurealis
Aurealis Award-winning works